Mohammadabad (also Romanized as Moḩammadābād; also known as Moḩammadābād-e Moḩammadī and Muhammadābād) is a village in Kavirat Rural District, Kavirat District, Aran va Bidgol County, Isfahan Province, Iran. At the 2006 census, its population was 1,849, in 484 families.

References 

Populated places in Aran va Bidgol County